Veronika Remenárová (born March 16, 1997) is a Slovak basketball player.

She has played for Valosun Brno and the Slovak national team.

She participated at the EuroBasket Women 2017.

References

1997 births
Living people
Slovak women's basketball players
Sportspeople from Ružomberok
Small forwards
Slovak expatriate basketball people in Germany
Slovak expatriate basketball people in the Czech Republic